The Einasleigh River is a river located in Far North Queensland, Australia. When combined with the Gilbert River, the river system is the largest river system in northern Australia.

Course and features
The Einasleigh River rises in the locality of Lyndhurst in the Einasleigh Uplands within the Atherton Tableland, draining the western slopes of the Great Dividing Range below Mount Remarkable. The river flows generally north, northwest and then west. The Einasleigh River descends  over its  course.

East of  the river is crossed by the Einasleigh River Bridge that carries the Gulf Developmental Road.

The Einasleigh River is a seasonal stream and discharge can vary greatly depending on the intensity of the monsoon. When combined with the Gilbert River, the Einasleigh River has the sixth-highest discharge of any river in Australia, slightly less than that of the Potomac in North America. In an intense wet season, however, the discharge can be as large as that of the Fraser River in Canada, and in a mild wet season like that of 1951–52, the discharge can be as little as one tenth of the long term mean. It is estimated that runoff from the combined Gilbert-Einasleigh River system totals about 2.2 percent of the total runoff from Australia. The record major flood of the Gilbert River was in January 1974 and the floods of February 1991 and in January and February 2009, caused widespread road closures and inundation of properties throughout the catchment.

See also

References

Rivers of Far North Queensland